The 1992 United States presidential election in North Dakota took place on November 3, 1992, as part of the 1992 United States presidential election. Voters chose three representatives, or electors to the Electoral College, who voted for president and vice president.

North Dakota was won by incumbent President George H. W. Bush (R-Texas) with 44.22% of the popular vote over Governor Bill Clinton (D-Arkansas) with 32.18%. Businessman Ross Perot (I-Texas) finished in third, with 23.07% of the popular vote. Clinton ultimately won the national vote, defeating incumbent President Bush and Perot.

Results

Results by county

See also
 United States presidential elections in North Dakota
 Presidency of Bill Clinton

Notes

References

North Dakota
1992
1992 North Dakota elections